Conus patglicksteinae is a species of sea snail, a marine gastropod mollusk in the family Conidae, the cone snails, cone shells or cones.

These snails are predatory and venomous. They are capable of "stinging" humans.

Description
The length of the holotype is 25.55 mm.

Distribution
Locus typicus: "(Trawled from) 400 feet depth off Palm Beach Island,
Palm Beach County, Florida, USA."

This marine species occurs in the Atlantic Ocean off Florida 
at a depth of 122 m.

References

 Petuch, E. J. 1987. New Caribbean Molluscan Faunas. 30, plate 5, figure 3-4.
 Filmer R.M. (2001). A Catalogue of Nomenclature and Taxonomy in the Living Conidae 1758 - 1998. Backhuys Publishers, Leiden. 388pp
 Puillandre N., Duda T.F., Meyer C., Olivera B.M. & Bouchet P. (2015). One, four or 100 genera? A new classification of the cone snails. Journal of Molluscan Studies. 81: 1-23

External links
 To World Register of Marine Species

patglicksteinae
Gastropods described in 1987